Nancy Hasty Evans is an American Republican politician from Wayland, Massachusetts. She represented the 13th Middlesex district in the Massachusetts House of Representatives from 1990 to 1996.

See also
 1991-1992 Massachusetts legislature
 1993-1994 Massachusetts legislature
 1995-1996 Massachusetts legislature

References

Year of birth missing
Year of death missing
Members of the Massachusetts House of Representatives
Women state legislators in Massachusetts
20th-century American women politicians
20th-century American politicians
People from Wayland, Massachusetts